Mamelon (from French mamelon, "nipple") may refer to

Mamelon (dentistry), a protrusion on a newly erupted tooth
Mamelon (fort), a hillock fortified by the Russians and captured by the French during the Siege of Sevastopol (1854–1855)
Mamelon (Sikasso), a hill in Sikasso, Mali
Mamelon (volcanology), a hill formed by eruption of "stiff" lava